Notre-Dame-des-Monts is a municipality of Charlevoix-Est Regional County Municipality, in the Capitale-Nationale region of Quebec, Canada.

Geography
As its name suggests, the territory of the municipality is dotted with mountains sometimes reaching . The River du Gouffre forms its western boundary.

History 
The municipality was founded in 1935 under the name of canton de Sales. In 1947 the parish of Notre-Dame-des-Monts was canonically erected, and the municipality took its name the following year. One can observe from the village, a series of mountains resembling a woman lying on her back. The name given to this series of mountains is “La Noyée”. Regional legend says it is the profile of an Indian girl lying on her back, drowned as she crossed Lake Nairne to meet her beloved, a white man from the nearby hamlet.

Demographics

Population

Private dwellings occupied by usual residents: 320 (total dwellings: 350)

Language
Mother tongue:
 English as first language: 0%
 French as first language: 98.6%
 English and French as first language: 0%
 Other as first language: 1.4%

See also
Rivière du Gouffre
Rivière de Chicago
Rivière à la Loutre
List of municipalities in Quebec

References

Incorporated places in Capitale-Nationale
Municipalities in Quebec